The following history of the AmigaOS 4 dispute documents the legal battle mainly between the companies Amiga, Inc. and Hyperion Entertainment over the operating system AmigaOS 4. On 30 September 2009, Hyperion and Amiga, Inc. reached a settlement agreement where Hyperion was granted an exclusive, perpetual and worldwide right to distribute and use 'The Software', a term used during the dispute and subsequent settlement to refer to source code from AmigaOS 3 and earlier, and ownership of AmigaOS 4.x and beyond.

Background

Amiga, Inc.

After Commodore filed for bankruptcy in 1994, its name and IP rights, including Amiga, were sold to Escom. Escom kept the Amiga products and sold the Commodore name on to Tulip Computers. Escom went bankrupt in 1997 and sold the Amiga IP to Gateway 2000 (now only Gateway). On 27 December 1999, Gateway sold the Amiga name and rights to Amino Development, who changed the company name to Amiga, Inc. once the assets had been acquired. The 'Amino' Amiga, Inc. and the 'KMOS' Amiga, Inc. are seen by Hyperion as legally distinct entities, contracts to one are of no relevance to the other.

Hyperion's OS4 project

Hyperion Entertainment released AmigaOS 4 (OS4) to the public in 2004. The five year development process led to accusations of vapourware and producing a modern PowerPC OS, given that Hyperion claimed that they had the original AmigaOS 3.1 source code to reference (a claim later proven accurate). This was made worse by the apparent much more rapid progress and maturity of competitor and alternative AmigaOS clone MorphOS, which had been begun several years earlier. Perhaps the most important feature of OS4 as regards the legal dispute is the presence of an entirely new PowerPC native kernel. ExecSG replaces the original Amiga Exec and is claimed entirely the work and property of Hyperion's subcontracted developers Thomas and Hans-Joerg Frieden. Neither Amiga, Inc. nor Hyperion actually own ExecSG, so technically cannot demand or hand it over, leaving the OS with fragmented and confused ownership.

The supposed rebirth of Amiga

In 2007 The Inquirer reported that the Amiga was inching closer to rebirth with the long-awaited release of AmigaOS 4.0, a new PowerPC-native version of the classic AmigaOS (Motorola 68k) from the 1980s. This new PowerPC OS would run on the AmigaOne machines, now out of production, which could only run Linux while waiting for the new PowerPC OS to be released. The year after, Amiga, Inc. also announced a new AmigaOS 4 compatible system that would be available shortly. The new machine was neither Genesi's Efika, nor the project codenamed Samantha, (now known as the Sam440ep from ACube Systems). The new hardware was from a new entrant, the Canadian company ACK Software Controls, and would have consisted of a budget and advanced model.

The dispute

Four days after Amiga, Inc. announced the new Amiga OS4 (OS4) compatible machines, they sued Hyperion Entertainment (Hyperion). Amiga, Inc. stated that it decided to produce a PowerPC version of AmigaOS in 2001 and on November 3, 2001, they signed a contract with Hyperion (then a game developer for the 68k Amiga platform as well as Linux and Macintosh). Amiga, Inc. gave Hyperion access to the sources of the last Commodore version, AmigaOS 3.1, but access to the post-Commodore versions OS 3.5 and 3.9 had to be purchased from the third party responsible for their development, since Haage & Partner (developers of OS 3.5 and 3.9) never returned their AmigaOS source code to Amiga, Inc.

Amiga, Inc. also said that its contract allowed Hyperion to use Amiga trademarks in the promotion of OS4 on Eyetech's AmigaOne and stipulated that Hyperion should make its best efforts to deliver OS 4 by March 1, 2002, a port of an elderly operating system (68k) for an entirely different processor architecture (PowerPC) in four months, an optimistic target that Hyperion failed to meet.

According to Amiga, Inc., the contract permits the purchase of the full sources of OS4 from Hyperion for US$25,000. The court filing says that Amiga, Inc. paid this sometime in April–May 2003, to keep Hyperion from going bankrupt, and that between then and November 21, 2006, Amiga, Inc. paid another $7,200, then $8,850 more which it says Hyperion said was owing.

Furthermore, in the filing, Amiga, Inc. President Bill McEwen revealed that Amiga, Inc. still hasn't received the sources for AmigaOS 4, that he's discovered that much of its development was outsourced to third-party contract developers and that it is not clear if Hyperion has all the rights to this external work. Eventually, after five years and $41,050, on 21 November 2006, Amiga, Inc. told Hyperion it had violated the contract and gave it 30 days to sort it out—to finish the product and hand over the sources. That did not happen, so the contract was terminated. on 20 December 2006.
Hyperion claims in its defense that Amiga, Inc. rendered the contract null through dealings with KMOS, a company which acquired the Amiga assets and renamed itself Amiga, Inc. over 2004–05.

Four days later, on 24 December 2006, Hyperion released the final version of OS4 – although according to Amiga, Inc., Hyperion claims that this was merely an update of the developers' preview version of 16 April 2004. Since the contract ended, Hyperion had no rights to use the name AmigaOS or any Amiga intellectual property, or to market OS4 or enter into any agreements about it with anyone else. Nevertheless, AmigaOS 4 was still being developed and distributed. Furthermore, ACube Systems released a series of Sam440ep motherboards, which run AmigaOS 4.

For a time, the case seemed deadlocked with neither side being apparently able to prove the point either way. Without Amiga, Inc.'s permission, Hyperion Entertainment could not use the AmigaOS name or related trademarks. Hyperion's defense centered around the potentially contract-voiding nature of the Amiga, Inc./KMOS handover, the problems they faced in acquiring the post-Commodore OS 3.x source code which Amiga, Inc. claimed to own and have access to, and the presence of new work and open components in the new operating system.

Hyperion Entertainment and Amiga, Inc. reached settlement agreement

On 30 September 2009, Hyperion Entertainment and Amiga, Inc. reached settlement agreement where Hyperion was granted, "an exclusive, perpetual, worldwide right to AmigaOS 3.1 in order to use, develop, modify, commercialize, distribute and market AmigaOS 4.x.

References

External links
 Amiga, Inc.
 Hyperion Entertainment
 ACube Systems

AmigaOS 4